This is list of archives in Cuba.

Archives in Cuba 

 Archivo Nacional de la República de Cuba in Havana
 Archivo Histórico Provincial de Camagüey
 Archivo Histórico Provincial de Cienfuegos
 Archivo Histórico Provincial de Holguín
 Archivo Histórico Provincial de Las Tunas
 Archivo Histórico Provincial de Matanzas
 Archivo Histórico Provincial de Pinar del Río
 Archivo Histórico Provincial de Sancti Spíritus
 Archivo Histórico Provincial de Villa Clara
 Instituto de Historia de Cuba in Havana
 Biblioteca Nacional Jose Marti Colecciones Especiales in Havana

See also 

 List of libraries in Cuba
 List of museums in Cuba
 Culture of Cuba
 Portal de Archivos Españoles (federated search of archives in Spain)

References

Further reading

External links 
 Archivos Históricos de Cuba

 
Archives
Cuba